Myrcia skeldingii was a species of plant in the family Myrtaceae. It was endemic to Jamaica. It became extinct due to habitat loss.

References

skeldingii
Extinct plants
Endemic flora of Jamaica
Taxonomy articles created by Polbot